Thomas Matthew Kavanagh (August 4, 1909 – April 19, 1975) was an American jurist.

Born near Carson City, Michigan, Kavanagh received his law degree from University of Detroit Mercy. He practiced law in Detroit, Michigan and then returned to Carson City, Michigan where he continued to practice law. Kavanagh served as city attorney and city clerk for Carson City. Kavanagh was a Democrat. He served as the 48th Michigan Attorney General from 1955 to 1957, defeating the incumbent Frank G. Millard in 1954. Thomas Kavanagh went on to serve as a justice of the Michigan Supreme Court from 1958 to 1975 which included eight years as chief justice from 1964 to 1966 from 1971 until his death in 1975. Justice Kavanagh was of no relation to fellow Justice (and successor as Chief Justice) Thomas G. Kavanagh. He died of cancer in Lansing, Michigan.

Notes

External links
 The Political Graveyard: Kavanagh, Thomas Matthew

1909 births
1975 deaths
Michigan Democrats
Michigan Attorneys General
Chief Justices of the Michigan Supreme Court
People from Carson City, Michigan
University of Detroit Mercy alumni
University of Detroit Jesuit High School and Academy alumni
Deaths from cancer in Michigan
20th-century American judges
20th-century American lawyers
Justices of the Michigan Supreme Court